Sultan Ismail Petra Bridge is a second bridge in Kota Bharu, Kelantan, Malaysia crossing Kelantan River after Sultan Yahya Petra Bridge. It is located between Tendong in Pasir Mas and Kampung Chabang Tiga Pendek in Kota Bharu. The construction of the four lane bridge began in 2001 and was completed in 2003. The bridge was officially opened on 15 September 2003 by the Sultan of Kelantan, Sultan Ismail Petra ibni Almarhum Sultan Yahya Petra.

See also
 Transport in Malaysia

Bridges in Kelantan
Bridges completed in 2003
Box girder bridges
Kota Bharu
2003 establishments in Malaysia